Marcie Bolen (born October 28, 1977) is an American guitarist from Detroit, Michigan.  She grew up in Southgate, Michigan and went to school for art and cosmetology.

Musical career 
Bolen is best known as a founding member of the garage rock band The Von Bondies. She was their guitarist/vocalist until 2006.  Bolen formed The Baby Killers with Jason Stollsteimer in 1997.  The band went through various line-up changes, and they eventually changed their name to Von Bondies in 2000.  As a member of Von Bondies, she made NME's Cool Lists in 2002 and 2003.  Bolen had also played bass in Slumber Party and appeared on their 2001 Psychedelicate recording.

In 2007, Marcie played live with Patti Smith in Ann Arbor  and New York .  She is currently playing in the band F'ke Blood.  She also has a country-inspired band with Taylor Hollingsworth.  Marcie records demos for her bands at her home in Ferndale, Michigan.

Artistic career 
As an artist, she goes by the nickname "Twirlyred."  She had worked on the cover booklet for White Stripes' 2001 White Blood Cells LP.

References

External links 
 

Living people
American rock guitarists
1977 births
Guitarists from Detroit
People from Ferndale, Michigan
21st-century American women guitarists
21st-century American guitarists